Department of Economic Affairs may refer to:

Department of Economic Affairs (UK), a 1960s UK government body
Department of Economic Affairs, a department of the Ministry of Finance in India
Federal Department of Economic Affairs, a Swiss government body